Cecidochloris is a green algae genus in the family Chlorangiellaceae.

References

External links
 
 

Chlamydomonadales genera
Chlamydomonadales